The Trio-Twister 103 is a German powered parachute that was designed by Siegfried Stolle and produced by Trio-Twister of Eichwalde. Now out of production, when it was available the aircraft was supplied as a complete ready-to-fly-aircraft.

The aircraft was introduced in 2003 and production ended when the company went out of business in 2005.

Design and development
The Trio-Twister 103 was designed to comply with the Fédération Aéronautique Internationale microlight category and the U.S. FAR 103 Ultralight Vehicles rules, hence its designation. It carries a German DULV certification. It features a  parachute-style wing, single-place accommodation, tricycle landing gear and one  single cylinder, two-stroke, air-cooled Hirth F-33 aircraft engine mounted in pusher configuration.

The aircraft carriage is a simple frame design with a central canopy attachment, built from bolted aluminium tubing. In flight steering is accomplished via foot pedals that actuate the canopy brakes, creating roll and yaw. On the ground the aircraft has nosewheel steering. The main landing gear incorporates spring rod suspension. The design employs a tilting seat to allow the pilot to see up and backwards to ensure that canopy inflates correctly.

Specifications (Trio-Twister 103)

See also
Trio-Twister 203

References

External links
Company website archives on Archive.org

103
2000s German sport aircraft
2000s German ultralight aircraft
Single-engined pusher aircraft
Powered parachutes